Malvaloca is a 1912 play written by the Spanish brothers Joaquín Álvarez Quintero and Serafín Álvarez Quintero. It has been adapted into films three times. A fallen woman from Málaga is eventually redeemed. The title refers to the name of the leading character.

References

Bibliography
 Peiró, Eva Woods. White Gypsies: Race and Stardom in Spanish Musical Films. University of Minnesota Press, 2012.

1912 plays
Spanish plays adapted into films
Plays set in Spain